Pencil test may refer to:

 Pencil test, a British version of drawing straws
 Pencil test (animation), an early version of an animated scene
 Pencil test (breasts), an informal test to determine if a girl needs to wear a bra
 Pencil Test (film), a 1988 animated short by Apple Inc.
 Pencil test (South Africa), a test to determine racial identity during apartheid